John Hadfield is an American jazz drummer, composer, and percussionist.

Hadfield was born and raised in Missouri. He studied music at University of Nevada, Las Vegas and the University of Missouri, Kansas City Conservatory, before moving to New York. He performs with a number of musicians and ensembles including Kinan Azmeh, Ron Blake, Petros Klampanis, Nguyên Lê, Yo-Yo Ma’s Silk Road Ensemble, Lenny Pickett, and Kenny Werner.

Life and career 

Born in Missouri, Hadfield began to play the drums as a child. He studied music as an undergraduate student at University of Nevada, Las Vegas before earning a Master’s degree at the University of Missouri, Kansas City Conservatory. He then settled in New York where he has been performing and composing for a variety of genres, in particular Jazz, world music, and classical and contemporary music. Hadfield currently teaches at NYU’s Jazz studies department.

Hadfield has performed with a number of musicians and ensembles around the world including Kinan Azmeh, Ron Blake, Petros Kampanis, Nguyên Lê, Yo-Yo Ma’s Silk Road Ensemble, Lenny Pickett, and Kenny Werner. Hadfield was described by Modern Drummer magazine in 2016 as having “created hybrid drumkit/percussion setups that ingeniously serve[] the music . . . His skillful sound-weaving choices create the illusion of a seamless multi-percussion section.”

Hadfield released three albums of his own compositions, John Hadfield’s Paris Quartet (2022), The Eye of Gordon (2008), and Displaced (2010). His most recent album, Paris Quartet, was hailed by one of the leading Belgian daily newspapers, Le Soir, as "very successful, the musicians are in perfect osmosis, the Rhodes developing its atmospheres, the sax its volutes, the percussion its rhythms, the base its counterpoints. Everything lands exactly at the right place. And the listener is happy." 

Hadfield has composed for many projects, including Heard by Others, a duo with Lenny Pickett, For James, a collaboration with Ron Blake, Believers, a trio with Brad Shepik and Sam Minaie, the electronic group Earspeak with Boris Skalsky, as well as the feature-length documentary After Spring. In 2017, reviewing Petros Klampanis' Chroma, Downbeat wrote, "Drummer John Hadfield is an ideal purveyor of Klampanis’ vision. Using a hybrid kit of traditional drumkit pieces and mounted percussion, he spurs on the ensemble with sensitive, yet infectiously grooving layers." In 2021, reviewing the Believers’ album, All About Jazz wrote, “Hadfield's contributions belong among the more rhythmically engaging cuts of the spectrum. First ostinato-based, then loudly improvised, "Seven Crotales" unveils groovy bass lines and spacey guitar work which is elaborated on again later, throughout "Nomadic Days.” The same year, French Jazz website Citizen Jazz published a review of Hadfield’s single For James honoring James Baldwin, poetically noting that he “deployed a clever and joyful beat, . . . a dew of happiness.”

Hadfield has also been heard playing drum and percussion on various TV shows and movies, including Saturday Night Live, P.O.V (TV Series documentary), The Light in Her Eyes, and Chuck Jones: Memories of Childhood.

Discography 

As a leader or collectives:

 John Hadfield’s Paris Quartet (2022) Outhere 
 John Hadfield “For James”  with Ron Blake (2021) Palindrome 76 Records
 Lenny Pickett and John Hadfield “Heard by Others”  (2020) Orenda Records
 Believers with Brad Shepik, Sam Minaie and John Hadfield “Believers”  (2020) Orenda Records
 John Hadfield “Displaced” (2010) Palindrome 76  Records
 John Hadfield “The Eye of Gordon” (2008) Palindrome 76 Records

Appears on:

 Brian Landrus "Red List" (2022) Palmetto
 David Wax Museum “Euphoric Ouroboric” (2021) Mark of the Leopard
 Kane Mathis "Geminus" feat. Sam Minaie and John Hadfield (2021) Nyaato
 Atlantico "A Stovepipe Hat Made From Silk" (2021) La Fabrica’son
 Maria Manousaki "Sole Voyage" (2020) PKmusic
 Nguyen Le Streams Quartet (2019) ACT Records
 Magic Moments 12 “One World of Music” (2019) ACT Records
 Joel Harrison “Free Country Volume 3” (2019)  HighNote Records
 Angel Gil-Ordóñez / Perspectives Ensemble “Falla: El amor brujo; El retablo de Maese Pedro” (2019) Naxos
 Petros Klampanis “Chroma” (2017) Motema Music
 David Lopato “Gending for a Spirit Rising” (2017)
 Petro Klampanis “Minor Dispute”  (2015)  Cristal Records
 Benjamin Koppel "Breaking Borders #4" featuring Uri Caine, John Hadfield and Kinan Azmeh (2015) Cowbell
 Fun Home (Broadway Cast Recording) (2015)  PS Classics
 Judy Kuhn “Rodgers, Rodgers & Guettel” (2015) PS Classics
 Duo Lev-Yulzari "Azafea"(with Frank London & John Hadfield) (2014) Editions De L'iemj
 Emilio Teubal “Musica Para Un Dragon Dormido” (2013) BJU Records
 Uri Sharlin & The Dogcat Ensemble “Back to the Woods” (2013) Folk Dune
 Cristina Pato “Migrations: Roots and Jazz in NYC” (2013) Sunnyside
 Suphala “Alien Ancestry” (2013) Tzadik
 Kinan Azmeh CityBand “Elastic City” (2012)
 Huda Asfour “Mars (Back and Forth)”  2012
 Christmas from the Blue Note (2010) Half Note Records
 Yo Yo Ma and Friends Songs of Joy and Peace (2009) SONY (2010 GRAMMY Award Winner for Best Classical Crossover Album.)
 Dead Heart Bloom “Strange Waves” (2010)
 Dead Heart Bloom “Oh Mercy” (2008)
 Dead Heart Bloom “Fall In” (2008)
 Dead Heart Bloom “In Chains” (2008)
 Skye Steele “Later Bloomer” (2007)
 Harel Shachel  & Anistar “Esh” 2005 The Common Gene

References

External links 
 John Hadfield’s official page
 Modern Drummer article
 The Rudimental Podcast featuring John Hadfield
 John Hadfield at All Music
 

American jazz drummers
American percussionists
Year of birth missing (living people)
Living people